Womack is a surname, and may refer to:

 Amelia Womack (born 1985), deputy leader of the Green Party of England and Wales
 Bobby Womack (1944–2014), American singer, guitarist and songwriter
 Bryant H. Womack (1931–1952), American soldier and recipient of the Medal of Honor
 Cecil Womack (1947–2013), American songwriter and recording artist
 Connie Britton (née Constance Elaine Womack, born 1967), American actress
 Floyd Womack (born 1978), American football player
 Frank Womack (1888–1968), English footballer 
 Jack Womack (born 1956), American author 
 James E. Womack (born 1941), American biologist 
 James P. Womack, American research director of the International Motor Vehicle Program
 John Womack, Jr. (born 1937),  American historian of Mexico and Latin America
 Lee Ann Womack (born 1966), American country music artist
 Linda Womack (born 1952), American singer and songwriter
 Mark Womack (born 1960), English actor
 Rob Womack (born 1971), English track and field athlete
 Samantha Womack (born 1972), English actress and singer
 Samuel Womack (born 1999), American football player
 Shawn Womack (born 1972), American politician
 Steve Womack (born 1957), American politician
 Tim Womack (1934–2010), English footballer
 Tommy Womack (born 1962), American singer-songwriter
 Tony Womack (born 1969), American baseball player

Fictional
 James Womack, fictional character in The Rock (film)

See also
 Womack (disambiguation)
 Wommack

de:Womack